The Men's 25 km competition at the 2022 World Aquatics Championships was held on 30 June 2022.

Results
The race was started at 07:00.

References

Men's 25 km
Men's 25 km open water